Yusra Amjad is a Pakistani poet, writer, and comedian based in Lahore.

Education 
Amjad completed her bachelor's degree in English literature from the Forman Christian College University in Lahore.

Life and Poetry 
Yusra Amjad was born in 1992 in Lahore, where she was raised and currently resides. Amjad's poetry has been published at The Missing Slate, Crossed Genres, Cities+, The Rising Phoenix Review, and Where Are You Press. Her feminist comedy covers the stereotypes of Pakistani society, relatable for desi woman.

Career 
Amjad's passions is to represent the crucial issues particularly faced by the women of Pakistan in a humorous way. Her poetry reflects feminism and is centred around women empowerment. She is the co-founder of The Auratnaak troupe, which aims to create a community of women who can uplift one another with comedy, and encourage more comedy from women.

Social Representation 
Amjad delivered a TEDx Talk in Lahore titled “On being young, unmarried, and female in Pakistan”. As an unmarried young woman, she questions the constraints married ladies face in maintaining their individuality and regretfully comments that Pakistani society doesn't want women to be adult members of society. She concludes by saying that to build a society based on gender equality, women's mobility, financial stability, and social position shouldn't be denied.

References

External links 

 Articles on Dawn
The Missing Slate Archives 

Living people
Pakistani women comedians
1992 births
Pakistani women writers
Pakistani women poets